The following is a list of notable deaths in March 1996.

Entries for each day are listed alphabetically by surname. A typical entry lists information in the following sequence:
 Name, age, country of citizenship at birth, subsequent country of citizenship (if applicable), reason for notability, cause of death (if known), and reference.

March 1996

1
Marie-Hélène de Rothschild, 68, French socialite.
Vergílio Ferreira, 80, Portuguese writer, essayist, and professor.
David Gebhard, 68, American architectural historian.
Khan Abdul Ghani Khan, 82, Pakistani poet, artist, writer and politician.
Susie Sharp, 88, American jurist and first female chief justice of the North Carolina Supreme Court.
Don Smith, 75, American basketball player (Minneapolis Lakers).
Ng Wui, 82, Hong Kong film director, writer and actor.

2
Jacobo Majluta Azar, 61, Vice President of the Dominican Republic, lung cancer.
Célestin Delmer, 89, French football player.
Naseem Hijazi, 81, Pakistani writer.
José López Rubio, 92, Spanish film director.
Lyle Talbot, 94, American actor, heart failure.

3
Marguerite Duras, 81, French writer and film director, esophageal cancer.
Randolph Harding, 81, Canadian politician.
Walter Kaaden, 76, German engineer.
John Krol, 85, American catholic cardinal.
Léo Malet, 86, French writer.
Meyer Schapiro, 91, American historian of Art.
Milt Woodard, 84, American sports writer and sport executive.

4
Berenger Bradford, 83, British Army officer.
Ted Cordner, 77, Australian rules football player.
Enrico Cucchi, 30, Italian football player, cancer.
Minnie Pearl, 83, American comedian and country singer, stroke.
John Sauer, 70, American gridiron football player, coach, and broadcaster.

5
Khondaker Mostaq Ahmad, 78, Bangladeshi politician and President of Bangladesh.
Whit Bissell, 86, American actor (The Magnificent Seven, Creature from the Black Lagoon, The Time Machine), Parkinson's disease.
Joshua Compston, 25, British art curator, drugs overdose.
Herb Hall, 88, American musician.
Galina Kravchenko, 91, Soviet/Russian actress.
José Santacruz Londoño, 52, Colombian drug trafficker, homicide.
Pithapuram Nageswara Rao, 65, Indian singer.
Fritz Huschke von Hanstein, 85, German racecar driver.

6
Jack Abel, 68, American comic book artist (Superman, Hulk, The Tomb of Dracula).
Simon Cadell, 45, British actor (Hi-de-Hi!, Life Without George, Watership Down), lung cancer.
Jurandir de Freitas, 55, Brazilian football player.
Douglas Jay, Baron Jay, 88, British politician.
José de Magalhães Pinto, 86, Brazilian lawyer, economist, banker and politician.
Paula Winslowe, 85, American actress (Our Miss Brooks, The Adventures of Ozzie and Harriet, Bambi).
Zdeněk Škrland, 82, Czechoslovak/Czech canoeist and Olympian.

7
Pinchas Menachem Alter, 69, Polish Hasidic rabbi.
Jacques Bobet, 76, French filmmaker.
Willie Fraser, 67, Scottish football player.
Ferdinand Panke, 73, German water polo player and Olympian.

8
"Mad Jack" Churchill, 89, British Army officer and master archer.
Bill Graber, 85, American pole vaulter and Olympian.
Bill Nicholson, 81, American baseball player.
Werner Schlichting, 91, German art director.

9
Ronald Ernest Aitchison, 74, Australian physicist and electronics engineer.
Akhtar-Ul-Iman, 80, Indian Urdu poet and screenwriter.
Mohammed al-Ghazali, 78, Egyptian Islamic cleric and scholar.
George Burns, 100, American comedian and actor (The George Burns and Gracie Allen Show, The Sunshine Boys, Oh, God!), Oscar winner (1976), heart failure.
Merle Eugene Curti, 98, American historian.
Imre Kovács, 74, Hungarian football player.
Alberto Pellegrino, 65, Italian fencer.
Richard M. Powers, 75, American science fiction illustrator.
Alfredo Scherer, 93, German-Brazilian catholic cardinal.
Ollie Walsh, 58, Irish hurler and hurling manager.

10
Hoàng Xuân Hãn, 88, Vietnamese professor of mathematics, linguist, and historian.
Ross Hunter, 75, American film and television producer, and actor, cancer.
Marc de Jonge, 47, French actor, traffic collision.
Butch Laswell, 37, American motorcycle stunt rider, motorcycle accident.
Gyula Nagy, 71, Hungarian football player and manager.

11
Elio Filippo Accrocca, 72, Italian poet, author, and translator.
Granville Beynon, 81, Welsh physicist.
Paul Crossley, 47, English football player, heart attack.
Vince Edwards, 67, American actor (Ben Casey, The Devil's Brigade, The Killing), pancreatic cancer.
Ludwig Fellermaier, 65, German politician.
Richard G. Folsom, 89, American mechanical engineer.
Biljana Jovanović, 43, Serbian author, peace activist and feminist.
Rex E. Lee, 61, American lawyer, academic and Solicitor General of the United States, pancreatic cancer.
Charles Oatley, 92, British physicist and electrical engineer.
Thorleif Olsen, 74, Norwegian football player.
Evangeline Walton, 88, American writer.

12
Bob Forte, 73, American gridiron football player.
Marte Harell, 89, Austrian actress.
Otto Møller Jensen, 55, Danish actor.
Eigil Knuth, 92, Danish explorer, archaeologist, sculptor and writer.
Gyula Kállai, 85, Hungarian politician.

13
Hsu Ching-chung, 88, Taiwanese politician.
Ted Fetter, 85, American lyricist.
Lucio Fulci, 68, Italian film director, screenwriter, producer, and actor, diabetes.
Sándor Gellér, 70, Hungarian football player.
Peer Guldbrandsen, 83, Danish film director.
Shafi Inamdar, 50, Indian actor.
Krzysztof Kieślowski, 54, Polish film director and screenwriter, heart attack.
Weston La Barre, 84, American anthropologist.
Marcelle Mercenier, 75, Belgian piano player.
Emilie Schenkl, 85, Austrian Hindu convert and partner of Indian nationalist Subhas Chandra Bose.

14
Dewi Bebb, 57, Welsh rugby player, broadcaster and journalist.
Wang Luobin, 82, Chinese musician, cancer.
Lucille H. McCollough, 90, American politician, complications from a stroke.
Andreas Münzer, 31, Austrian bodybuilder, organ failure.
Dean Prater, 37, American gridiron football player, drowned.
Maj Sønstevold, 78, Swedish composer.

15
Gad al-Haq, 78, Egyptian Grand Imam of al-Azhar, heart attack.
Ed Beach, 67, American basketball player.
Helen Chadwick, 42, British sculptor, photographer and installation artist, heart attack.
Harold Courlander, 87, American anthropologist.
Roswell Gilpatric, 89, American lawyer and Deputy Secretary of Defense.
Cheng Heng, 80, Cambodian politician.
Wolfgang Koeppen, 89, German writer.
Francis Joseph Murray, 85, American mathematician.
Robert Pearce, 88, American wrestler and olympic champion.
Olga Rudge, 100, American musician.

16
Charlie Barnett, 41, American actor (Miami Vice) and comedian, AIDS-related complications.
Ray S. Cline, 77, American government official, Alzheimer's disease.
Des Fothergill, 75, Australian rules football player and cricket player.
David Gordon, 51, American economist.
Evan Green, 65, Australian journalist.
Dennis Jennings, 85, English football player.

17
Anil Chatterjee, 66, Indian actor.
René Clément, 82, French film director and screenwriter.
Thomas O. Enders, 64, American diplomat.
Elsa Respighi, 101, Italian composer.
Nils Sköld, 74, Swedish Army lieutenant-general.
Terry Stafford, 54, American singer and songwriter, organ dysfunction.

18
Angelico Chavez, 85, American Friar Minor, priest, historian, author, poet and painter.
Odysseas Elytis, 84, Greek poet and art critic, heart attack.
Jacquetta Hawkes, 85, British archaeologist.
Enrique Jordá, 84, Spanish-American conductor.
Maria Teresa Pelegrí i Marimón, 88, Spanish composer.
Niní Marshall, 92, Argentine comedian.
Robert van der Veen, 89, Dutch field hockey player.
Shin Yung-kyoo, 53, North Korean football player.

19
Virginia Henderson, 98, American nurse, researcher, and author.
Chen Jingrun, 62, Chinese mathematician, pneumonia.
W. H. Murray, 83, Scottish mountaineer and writer.
Colin Pittendrigh, 77, British-American chronobiologist.
Alan Ridout, 61, British composer and teacher.
Walter S. Sullivan, 78, American science reporter and author.
Lise Østergaard, 71, Danish psychologist and minister.

20
Claude Bourdet, 86, French politician and writer.
Hans Conzett, 80, Swiss publisher and politician.
Albert Ganzenmüller, 91, German politician.
Jim Pendleton, 72, American baseball player.

21
Richard Leslie Hill, 95, English civil servant and historian.
Robert B. Mautz, 81, American lawyer, law professor, and university administrator.
Sverre Sørsdal, 95, Norwegian boxer.
Nikolai Usenko, 71, Russian Ryadovoy and Hero of the Soviet Union for his actions during WWII.

22
Ron Hayward, 78, British politician.
Claude Mauriac, 81, French writer.
Don Murray, 50, American drummer, complications following ulcer surgery.
Václav Nelhýbel, 76, Czech composer.
Robert F. Overmyer, 59, American test pilot and astronaut, aviation accident.
Pete Whisenant, 66, American baseball player.
Billy Williamson, 71, American Rock and roll musician.

23
Roderic H. Davison, 78, American historian of the Middle East.
François Fontaine, 78, French civil servant and writer.
Margit Manstad, 93, Swedish actress.
Pete Martin, 76, Canadian football player.
J. D. "Jay" Miller, 73, American musician.
Jacques Toja, 66, French actor, cancer.

24
Lola Beltrán, 64, Mexican singer, actress, and television presenter, pulmonary embolism.
Idilio Cei, 58, Italian football player.
John Gerstner, 81, American theologian.
Étienne Hajdú, 88, French and Hungarian sculptor.
Liam O'Brien, 83, American screenwriter and television producer, heart attack.
Ray Pepper, 90, American baseball player.
Jean-Claude Piumi, 55, French football player.
Jerry Robertson, 52, American baseball player, car accident.
Spartaco Schergat, 75, Italian military frogman during World War II.
Sarah Thomasson, 70, Swedish alpine skier.

25
Mary Lavin, 83, Irish writer.
Marvin Albert, 72, American author.
Dioscoro S. Rabor, 84, Filipino ornithologist, zoologist, and conservationist.
John Snagge, 91, British reporter, esophageal cancer.

26
Robert Bradshaw, 41, American figure skater.
William Harold Collins, 74, American gridiron football player.
Joseph Kallinger, 60, American serial killer, heart failure.
Edmund Muskie, 81, American statesman, political leader, and U.S. Secretary of State, heart failure.
David Packard, 83, American electrical engineer and co-founder, with Bill Hewlett, of Hewlett-Packard.
Käte Strobel, 88, German politician.
Elmer Ward, 83, American gridiron football player.

27
Seán Browne, 79, Irish politician.
Bob Chambers, 90, Canadian artist.
Ignace Kowalczyk, 82, French football player.
André Lefevere, 50, Belgian translator and linguist, leukemia.
Samuel Schoenbaum, 69, American Shakespearean biographer and scholar, prostate cancer.
Charlie Timmons, 79, American gridiron football player.

28
Hans Blumenberg, 75, German philosopher and intellectual historian.
Peter Dombrovskis, 51, Australian photographer, heart attack.
Edith Fowke, 82, Canadian folklorist.
Shin Kanemaru, 81, Japanese politician, stroke.
Barbara McLean, 92, American film editor.
Siegfried Mynhardt, 90, South African actor.
Don Ross, 81, American baseball player.

29
Frank Daniel, 69, Czech director, scriptwriter and university educator, heart attack.
Bill Goldsworthy, 51, Canadian ice hockey player, AIDS-related complications.
Ivan Kalita, 69, Soviet/Russian equestrian and Olympic champion.
Juan Negrón, 66, Puerto Rican US Army soldier and recipient of the Medal of Honor.
Gordon Pask, 67, British psychologist.
Helmut von Bockelberg, 84, German politician and tax advisor.

30
Frederick Miller, 84, British paediatrician.
Richard Kress, 71, German football player.
Ryoei Saito, 79, Japanese businessman.
Bjørn Stiler, 84, Danish racing cyclist and Olympian.

31
Dario Bellezza, 51, Italian poet, author and playwright, AIDS-related complications.
Nino Borsari, 84, Italian cyclist.
Dante Giacosa, 91, Italian automobile designer and engineer.
Delia Magaña, 93, Mexican actress, dancer, and singer, pneumonia.
Jeffrey Lee Pierce, 37, American singer, songwriter, guitarist and author, cerebral hemorrhage.

References 

1996-03
 03